Myron Goldsmith (September 15, 1918 – July 15, 1996) was an American architect and designer. He was a student of Mies van der Rohe and Pier Luigi Nervi before designing 40 projects at Skidmore, Owings & Merrill from 1955 to 1983. His last 16 years at the firm he was a general partner in its Chicago office. His best known project is the McMath–Pierce solar telescope building constructed in 1962 at the Kitt Peak National Observatory in Arizona. It is visited by an estimated 100,000 people a year.

Background
Goldsmith was born in Chicago and graduated in 1939 from the Illinois Institute of Technology, where he studied under Mies, whose Chicago office he joined in 1946. He worked there until 1953, when he received a Fulbright grant to study under Nervi at the University of Rome.

Career
His first major projects at Skidmore were two United Airlines hangars at San Francisco International Airport, one of which used cantilevered steel girders to hold four DC-8 jetliners. He was a professor of architecture at the Illinois Institute of Technology beginning in 1961.

In his 1987 monograph he wrote that: "A building should be built with economy, efficiency, discipline and order." At the time of his death, he was a member of a team organized by the institute to design a 120-story office, hotel and commercial structure in Seoul for the Hyundai Engineering and Construction Company. The project, known as "Hankang City," would have been one of the world's tallest buildings at 1,699.48 feet; but the project was canceled and the building was never built.

Projects
Plaza on Dewitt (1960) 
McMath–Pierce solar telescope building (1962)
Brunswick Building (1965)
Oakland Alameda County Coliseum (1966)
The Republic Newspaper Office (1971) in Columbus, Indiana
Ruck-a-Chucky Bridge (unbuilt) planned to cross the American River in Auburn, California northeast of Sacramento

Gallery

Exhibitions 

The Unknown Mies van der Rohe and His Disciples of Modernism, Art Institute of Chicago, Chicago (1986)
Myron Goldsmith: Poet of Structure, Canadian Centre for Architecture, Montreal (1991)

See also
Gary Berkovich

References

External links
Myron Goldsmith pays tribute to Fazlur Rahman Khan in the South Asian American Digital Archive (SAADA)
Finding aid for the Myron Goldsmith fonds, Canadian Centre for Architecture.

1918 births
1996 deaths
20th-century American architects
Architects from Chicago
Illinois Institute of Technology alumni
American expatriates in Italy
Fulbright alumni